Paristan is a 1944 Indian Hindi-language fantasy film. The film was directed by Mahesh Kaul for Acharya Art productions. It starred Pahari Sanyal, Anjali Devi, Kamal Zamindar, Sunalini Devi, Moni Chatterjee and Padma Bannerjee. The music was composed by Ninu Majumdar and the lyrics were by Roopdas and Ninu Majumdar. This was Mahesh Kaul's second film after Angoori (1943).

Cast
Pahari Sanyal
Anjali Devi
Kamal Zamindar
Sunalini Devi
Moni Chatterjee
Padma Bannerjee
Ranjit Kumari
Anwaribai

Soundtrack
The film had ten songs with music composed by Ninu Majumdar and the lyrics written by Majumdar and Roopdas. The soundtrack label was Columbia Records.

Song List
"Kholo Kholi Koi Dil Ki Khidki"
"O Saiyan Dekhi Tori Shaan"
"Bheeshan Hatya Kaand Kaho"
"Ae Re Balam Duhai"
"Nindiya Ri More Lalna Ki"
"Hanso Hanso Aur Khoob Hanso"
"Phool Uthi Band Kali"
"Chayi Bahaar Sakhi"
"Ek Akal Ki Baat"
"Pal Bhar Ki Pehchaan"

References

External links
 

1944 films
1940s Hindi-language films
Indian fantasy films
1940s fantasy films
Indian black-and-white films